Jon Vickers (born 23 December 1988 in Bristol, England) is a rugby union player. He moved to Exeter Chiefs from fellow Premiership side Northampton Saints. He plays as a hooker but can also play both sides at prop.

Vickers moved from Exeter Chiefs to Plymouth Albion for the 2012-13 season. It was announced at the end of the 2012-13 season that Vickers would leave Plymouth for Championship rivals Nottingham.

References

External links
Northampton Saints profile

1988 births
Living people
English rugby union players
Exeter Chiefs players
Northampton Saints players
Plymouth Albion R.F.C. players
Rugby union players from Bristol
Rugby union props